High dynamic range (HDR) is a dynamic range higher than usual, synonyms are wide dynamic range, extended dynamic range, expanded dynamic range.

The term is often used in discussing the dynamic range of various signals such as images, videos, audio or radio. It may apply to the means of recording, processing, and reproducing such signals including analog and digitized signals.

The term is also the name of some of the technologies or techniques allowing to achieve high dynamic range images, videos, or audio.

Imaging 
In this context, the term high dynamic range means there is a lot of variation in light levels within a scene or an image. The dynamic range refers to the range of luminosity between the brightest area and the darkest area of that scene or image.

 (HDRI) refers to the set of imaging technologies and techniques that allow to increase the dynamic range of images or videos. It covers the acquisition, creation, storage, distribution and display of images and videos.

Modern movies have often been filmed with cameras featuring a higher dynamic range, and legacy movies can be converted even if manual intervention would be needed for some frames (as when black-and-white films are converted to color). Also, special effects, especially those that mix real and synthetic footage, require both HDR shooting and rendering. HDR video is also needed in applications that demand high accuracy for capturing temporal aspects of changes in the scene.  This is important in monitoring of some industrial processes such as welding, in predictive driver assistance systems in automotive industry, in surveillance video systems, and other applications.

Capture 

In photography and videography, a technique, commonly named high dynamic range (HDR), allows to increase the dynamic range of captured photos and videos beyond the native capability of the camera. It consists of capturing multiple frames of the same scene but with different exposures and then combining them into one, resulting into an image with a dynamic range higher than those of individually captured frames.

Some of the sensors on modern phones and cameras may even combine the two images on-chip. This also allows a wider dynamic range being directly available to the user for display or processing without in-pixel compression.

Some cameras designed for use in security applications can capture HDR videos by automatically providing two or more images for each frame, with changing exposure. For example, a sensor for 30fps video will give out 60fps with the odd frames at a short exposure time and the even frames at a longer exposure time..

Modern CMOS image sensors can often capture a high dynamic range images from a single exposure. This reduces the need to use the multi-exposure HDR capture technique.

High dynamic range captured images are used in extreme dynamic range applications like welding or automotive work. In security cameras the term used instead of HDR is "wide dynamic range".

Because of the nonlinearity of some sensors image artifacts can be common.

Rendering 

High-dynamic-range rendering (HDRR) is the real-time rendering and display of virtual environments using a dynamic range of 65,535:1 or higher (used in computer, gaming, and entertainment technology).

Dynamic range compression or expansion 

The technologies used to store, transmit, display and print images have limited dynamic range. When captured or created images have a higher dynamic range, they must be tone mapped in order to reduce that dynamic range.

Storage 
High-dynamic-range formats for image and video files are able to store more dynamic range than traditional 8-bit gamma formats.  These formats include:

 Formats that are only used for storage purpose, such as:
Raw image formats 
Formats that use a linear transfer function with high bit-depth 
Formats that use a logarithmic transfer function
OpenEXR 
ACES
 HDR formats that can be used for both storage and transmission to displays, such as:
HDR10
HDR10+
Dolby Vision
HLG
OpenEXR was created in 1999 by Industrial Light & Magic (ILM) and released in 2003 as an open source software library. OpenEXR is used for film and television production.

Academy Color Encoding System (ACES) was created by the Academy of Motion Picture Arts and Sciences and released in December 2014. ACES is a complete color and file management system that works with almost any professional workflow and it supports both HDR and wide color gamut. More information can be found at https://www.ACESCentral.com (WCG).

Transmission to displays 

High dynamic range (HDR) is also the common name of a technology allowing to transmit high dynamic range videos and images to compatible displays. That technology also improves other aspects of transmitted images, such as color gamut.

In this context,

 HDR displays refers to displays compatible with that technology.
 HDR formats refers to formats such as HDR10, HDR10+, Dolby Vision and HLG.
 HDR video refers to a video encoded in an HDR format. Thoses HDR video have a greater bit depth, luminance and color volume than standard dynamic range (SDR) video which uses a conventional gamma curve.

On January 4, 2016, the Ultra HD Alliance announced their certification requirements for a HDR display. The HDR display must have either a peak brightness of over 1000 cd/m2 and a black level less than 0.05 cd/m2 (a contrast ratio of at least 20,000:1) or a peak brightness of over 540 cd/m2 and a black level less than 0.0005 cd/m2 (a contrast ratio of at least 1,080,000:1). The two options allow for different types of HDR displays such as LCD and OLED.

Some options to use HDR transfer functions that better match the human visual system other than a conventional gamma curve include the HLG and perceptual quantizer (PQ). HLG and PQ require a bit depth of 10-bits per sample.

Display 

The dynamic range of a display refers to range of luminosity the display can reproduce, from the black level to its peak brightness. The contrast of a display refers to the ratio between the luminance of the brightest white and the darkest black that a monitor can produce. Multiple technologies allowed to increase the dynamic range of displays.

In May 2003, BrightSide Technologies demonstrated the first HDR display at the Display Week Symposium of the Society for Information Display. The display used an array of individually-controlled LEDs behind a conventional LCD panel in a configuration known as "local dimming" today. BrightSide later introduced a variety of related display and video technologies enabling visualization of HDR content. In April 2007, BrightSide Technologies was acquired by Dolby Laboratories.

OLED displays have high contrast. MiniLED improves contrast.

Audio 

In Audio, the term high dynamic range means there is a lot of variation in the levels of the sound. Here, the dynamic range refers to the range between the highest volume and lowest volume of the sound.

XDR (audio) is used to provide higher-quality audio when using microphone sound systems or recording onto cassette tapes.
 
HDR Audio is a dynamic mixing technique used in EA Digital Illusions CE Frostbite Engine to allow relatively louder sounds to drown out softer sounds.

Dynamic range compression is a set of techniques used in audio recording and communication to put high-dynamic-range material through channels or media of lower dynamic range. Optionally, dynamic range expansion is used to restore the original high dynamic range on playback.

Radio

In radio, high dynamic range is important especially when there are potentially interfering signals.  Measures such as spurious-free dynamic range are used to quantify the dynamic range of various system components such as frequency synthesizers.  HDR concepts are important in both conventional and software-defined radio design.

Instrumentation

In many fields, instruments need to have a very high dynamic range.  For example, in seismology, HDR accelerometers are needed, as in the ICEARRAY instruments.

Realtime HDR vision

In the 1970s and 1980s, Steve Mann invented the Generation-1 and
Generation-2 "Digital Eye Glass", as a vision aid to help people
see better, with some versions being built into welding helmets for HDR vision

See also, IEEE Technology and Society Magazine 31(3) and the supplemental material entitled "GlassEyes".

See also
Rec. 2100 – ITU-R Recommendation for HDR
Ultra HD Forum – Organization that has created standards for HDR
Color space
Color grading

References

External links

 
Broad-concept articles
Display technology
Electrical engineering
Film and video technology
Television technology